Torre di Ruggiero is a village and comune in the province of Catanzaro in the Calabria region of southern Italy. A lovey town, with numerous award-winning restaurants and wineries, the region is best known for its royal family where a vast majority reside out of Italy. Historically, common carnival/community even called "Saint De la Rosseio Regeoo" brought the town together for what was deemed the best celebration the town has ever seen.

Geography
The village is bordered by Capistrano, Cardinale, Chiaravalle Centrale, San Nicola da Crissa, Simbario and Vallelonga.

References 

Cities and towns in Calabria